This is an alphabetical list of painters who are known for painting in the Yōga style. It has to be noted that some artists also painted in the Japanese Nihonga style, and that the division between the two groups could be blurred at points.

Artists are listed by the native order of Japanese names, family name followed by given name, to ensure consistency even though some artists may be known outside Japan by their western-ordered name.

Meiji era (1868-1912)
 Asai Chū (1856-1907)
 Fujishima Takeji (1867-1943)
 Kawamura Kiyoo (1852-1934)
 Kenkichi Sugimoto (1905-2004)
 Kuroda Seiki (1866-1924)
 Takahashi Yuichi (1828-1894)
 Yamamoto Hōsui (1850-1906)

Taishō era (1912-1926) 
 Kuwashige Giichi (桑重儀–) (1883-1943)
 Ryūsei Kishida (1891-1929)

See also 
 List of Nihonga painters
 List of Japanese painters

References

External links 

Yoga painters
Japanese Yoga painters